Samantha Indika de Saram (born 2 September 1973) is a former Sri Lankan cricketer. He is a right-handed batsman and a right-arm off-break bowler who usually occupies the position of wicketkeeper. He is a past student of St. Thomas' College, Matara.

Domestic career
A powerful batsman, Saram kept wicket and scored a vast number of runs for his school team, becoming one of the most reliable batsmen in the country, including an innings in which he alone scored 304 runs in just 149 balls. However, playing for his Test side, he was never really given a chance to shine, and he has not played a Test match for nearly six years, opting instead for the realms of Twenty20 cricket. He made his Twenty20 debut on 17 August 2004, for Galle Cricket Club in the 2004 SLC Twenty20 Tournament.

He has also played for Sultans of Sylhet in Bangladesh's NCL T20 Bangladesh.

He was a continuous member in Sri Lanka squad for Hong Kong Cricket Sixes competition, where Sri Lanka won the tournament under his captaincy in 2007.

International career
He was a in and out member for the Sri Lanka team due to many permanent batsman retained in the squad. He is the 100th ODI cap for Sri Lanka as well.

After dropped from international squad in 2001, de Seram was brought in to the Twenty20 International team in 2009 for the 2009 ICC World Twenty20, and played debut against India. This was the only match played by him until his retirement.

References

1973 births
Living people
Abahani Limited cricketers
Asian Games competitors for Sri Lanka
Basnahira Cricket Dundee cricketers
Basnahira North cricketers
Colts Cricket Club cricketers
Cricketers at the 1998 Commonwealth Games
Cricketers at the 2010 Asian Games
Moors Sports Club cricketers
Ragama Cricket Club cricketers
Ruhuna cricketers
Sri Lanka Test cricketers
Sri Lanka One Day International cricketers
Sri Lanka Twenty20 International cricketers
Sri Lankan cricketers
Sri Lanka Cricket Combined XI cricketers
Sportspeople from Matara, Sri Lanka
Sylhet Division cricketers
Tamil Union Cricket and Athletic Club cricketers
Uva cricketers
Wayamba cricketers
Commonwealth Games competitors for Sri Lanka
Wicket-keepers